Bambola (also spelled Bámbola) is a 1996 erotic melodrama film written and directed by Bigas Luna.

Cast 
 Valeria Marini as Mina, aka "Bambola"
 Stefano Dionisi as Flavio
 Jorge Perugorría as  Furio
 Manuel Bandera as  Settimio
 Antonino Iuorio as  Ugo
 Anita Ekberg as  Mother Greta

Controversy 

Because of the many scenes of sexual abuse, the film was R-rated, something that caused the ire of lead actress Valeria Marini, who asserted that she had been promised the cut of the three more explicit scenes and a ban for just people under 14 years. The actress therefore sued the producer Marco Poccioni demanding the immediate withdrawal of the film, but her request was eventually rejected.

Reception 
The film received extremely negative criticism. Film critic Morando Morandini referred to it as "the most silly, foolish and amateurish film of Bigas Luna", while Paolo Mereghetti was even tougher, saying he "never have come out of a movie theater with a much deeper discomfort."

References

External links

1996 films
Films directed by Bigas Luna
1990s erotic drama films
Spanish erotic drama films
French erotic drama films
Italian erotic drama films
Films set in Emilia-Romagna
1990s Italian-language films
1990s French films
1990s Italian films